Helena Aksela (born 1947, Perho) is a Finnish physicist and emeritus professor at the University of Oulu. She was the first woman to be appointed a professor of physics in Finland.

Aksela gained her doctorate from the University of Oulu in 1980. The electron spectroscopy group led by Aksela was, in the 1990s, one of the first groups to experimentally apply the Auger resonant Raman effect. She was named a professor at the University of Oulu in 2000, in the field of atomic and molecular physics. In 2001 she was appointed Academy Professor. Later she has worked in the department of physical sciences electron spectroscopy research group. She was a member of the Academy of Finland Research Council for Natural Sciences and Engineering from 2007 to 2009.

Aksela was made a Fellow of the Finnish Physical Society in 2013, based on her pioneering research work involving photoemission spectroscopy with synchrotrons, and associated researcher training, in addition to her active role in science politics.

Aksela is married to professor Seppo Aksela.

Awards and recognition
 Award of the Pentti Kaitera fund, 2004
 Finnish Academy of Science and Letters member from 2002

References 

20th-century Finnish physicists
Members of the Finnish Academy of Science and Letters
Academic staff of the University of Oulu
1947 births
Living people
Finnish women scientists
21st-century Finnish physicists